The 2018–19 Biathlon World Cup – Stage 6 was the sixth event of the season and was held in Antholz-Anterselva, Italy, from 24 to 27 January 2019.

Schedule of events 
The events took place at the following times.

Medal winners

Men

Women

References 

2018–19 Biathlon World Cup
2019 in Italian sport
Biathlon World Cup - Stage 6
Biathlon competitions in Italy